Ruth Alice "Ronnie" Gilbert (September 7, 1926 – June 6, 2015), was an American folk singer, songwriter, actress and political activist. She was one of the original members of the music quartet the Weavers, as a contralto with Pete Seeger, Lee Hays, and Fred Hellerman.

Early life
Gilbert was born in Brooklyn, New York City and considered herself a native New Yorker her whole life. Her parents were Jewish immigrants from Eastern Europe. Her mother, Sarah, came from Warsaw, Poland and was a dressmaker and trade unionist, and her father, Charles Gilbert, came from Ukraine and was a factory worker. 

From a young age she had a strong sense of social justice and gave credit for this to her mother who had been involved with the  Polish-Jewish Bund. She went to Anacostia High School and was almost expelled because of her resistance to participating in a blackface minstrel show with white students, citing Paul Robeson's "denunciations of racism."   Gilbert came to Washington, D.C., during World War II at the age of 16, took a government job and joined a protest folk-singing group, the Priority Ramblers. She performed with this group before founding the Weavers with Pete Seeger. When she returned to New York, Gilbert became involved in organising the Office Workers' Union and worked for the Textile Workers' Union.  She encountered Library of Congress folklorist Alan Lomax and Woody Guthrie and other folk singers.

Career
Gilbert's singing was characterized as "a crystalline, bold contralto."
Her voice is heard, blending with and rising over the others, in Weavers tracks such as "This Land Is Your Land", "If I Had a Hammer", "On Top of Old Smoky", "Goodnight, Irene", "Kisses Sweeter than Wine", and "Tzena, Tzena, Tzena".

Early music and activism 
The Weavers were an influential folk-singing group that was blacklisted in the early 1950s, during a period of widespread anti-communist hysteria, because of the group's left-wing sympathies. Following the Weavers' dissolution in 1953 due to the blacklist, she continued her activism on a personal level, traveling to Cuba in 1961 on a trip that brought her back to the United States on the same day that country banned travel to Cuba. She also participated in the Parisian protests of 1968 after traveling to that country to work with British theatrical director Peter Brook.

In 1968, she appeared on Broadway in a dramatic, non-musical role -- the concentration camp survivor Mrs. Rosen -- in the original production of Robert Shaw's play The Man in the Glass Booth. 

Gilbert moved to Berkeley in 1971 and began to learn and offer therapy. The next year, she entered graduate school. By 1974, she had earned an MA in clinical psychology and worked as a therapist for a few years. Gilbert later said that at the time, she needed a change from her career on Broadway, her daughter was grown up and she "fell into" therapy, including Gestalt, Freudian and Jungian practices.

Music with Holly Near and HARP 
In 1974, Holly Near dedicated her album A Live Album to Gilbert. At the time, Near didn't even know if she was still alive, so she didn't ask Gilbert for permission. Gilbert found out about the dedication from her daughter and met Near soon after. This is how Gilbert describes meeting Near:

I told her about how her record was astonishing to me ... I was so moved. First I was kind of teed off about it and then ... I was just in tears the whole time, and figured out this has been going on while I haven't been looking ... This consciousness, this woman consciousness has been happening and was happening in music ... Of course, I loved her because she was ... the coming together of all the things I loved in music, from folk music to Broadway ... she had that kind of delivery and voice and she could handle pretty much anything. It was like she had the social consciousness in a new contemporary way that the Weavers had.

In 1980, part of The Weavers: Wasn't That a Time! was filmed in the loft Gilbert was living in. The film-maker left the camera running after the Near interview, capturing Near and Gilbert as they sang "Hay Una Mujer." That song was left in the film and some of the audience called Near's record company to see if/when she and Gilbert would be touring. Gilbert says that this "jump started [her and Near] into a musical partnership." They toured together nationally in 1983 for their first live album, Lifeline.

Near and Gilbert joined Arlo Guthrie and Pete Seeger for the 1984 quartet album HARP (an acronym for "Holly, Arlo, Ronnie, and Pete"). During this tour, Gilbert met and fell in love with her future wife, Donna Korones. She came out as a lesbian soon after she started dating Korones.

In 1985, Gilbert performed with Near, Guthrie, and Seeger at the Ohio State Fair. She performed at the 10th Michigan Womyn's Music Festival and the first Redwood Festival with Near. She also performed at the Vancouver Folk Festival, the National Women's Music Festival, and Sisterfire.

in 1986 she and Near recorded Singing With You.

During that period Gilbert wrote and appeared in a one-woman show about Mary Harris "Mother" Jones, the Irish-American activist and labor organizer, and in a second work based on author Studs Terkel's book, Coming of Age. In her portrayal of Jones, Gilbert aimed to portray a woman who was at once "spunky and sarcastic, fearless and opinionated", and the show's songs, most of which were written by Gilbert, provide an insight into a time of resistance to injustice in the United States.

Later music and activism 
In 1991, Gilbert recorded "Lincoln and Liberty" and "When Johnny Comes Marching Home" for the compilation album, Songs of the Civil War.

In 1992, she accompanied the Vancouver Men's Chorus on the song Music in My Mother's House from their album Signature.

At the age of 10, after hearing Paul Robeson sing for the first time, Gilbert commented: "Songs are dangerous, songs are subversive and can change your life."

She continued to tour and appear in plays, folk festivals, and music festivals well into her 80s. She continued her protest work, participating in groups such as Women in Black to protest Israeli occupation of Palestinian territories in addition to United States policies in the middle-east. In 2006, the Weavers received a Lifetime Achievement Award at the Grammys. Gilbert and Hellerman accepted the award. Pete Seeger was unable to attend the ceremony, and Hays had died in 1981. Seeger died in 2014.

Personal life
Gilbert was married to Martin Weg from 1950 until 1959, and the couple have one daughter, Lisa (born 1952). Their marriage ended in divorce. In 2004,when gay marriage was temporarily legalized in San Francisco,  Gilbert married Donna Korones, her manager and partner of almost two decades. Gilbert moved to Caspar, California in 2006.

Gilbert died on June 6, 2015, at a nursing facility in Mill Valley, California, from natural causes, at age 88.

References

External links
 
 
 Ronnie Gilbert profile at FilmReference.com

1926 births
2015 deaths
The Weavers members
Folk musicians from New York (state)
American street performers
American women singers
American film actresses
American folk singers
American people of Polish-Jewish descent
American people of Ukrainian-Jewish descent
Jewish American actresses
Jewish American musicians
LGBT Jews
LGBT people from New York (state)
American LGBT singers
Jewish folk singers
Women's music
American lesbian musicians
People from Southeast (Washington, D.C.)
20th-century LGBT people
21st-century LGBT people
21st-century American Jews
21st-century American women